Pogonocherus marcoi is a species of beetle in the family Cerambycidae. It was described by Sama in 1993. It is known from Italy. It feeds on Pinus pinea.

References

Pogonocherini
Beetles described in 1993